Nanuet is a hamlet and census-designated place in the town of Clarkstown, Rockland County, New York, United States. The third largest hamlet in Clarkstown, it is located north of Pearl River, south of New City, east of Spring Valley, and west of West Nyack. It has one of three Rockland County stations on New Jersey Transit's Pascack Valley Line. The population of Nanuet was 17,882 at the 2010 census.

The opening of the New York State Thruway (Interstate 87/287), the Tappan Zee Bridge, and the Palisades Interstate Parkway in the mid-1950s helped usher in decades of population growth and real estate development, including the construction of the Nanuet Mall and local shopping centers.

In 2011, CNN Money ranked Nanuet 76 on its annual 100 Best Places to Live list, citing its relatively inexpensive housing and the recreation and shopping opportunities in the area. Nanuet was also ranked 24th on CNN Money's annual 100 Best Places to Live list in 2007.

History

The first name of the place was Clarkstown, a name it retained until 1856 when, at the suggestion of James De Clark, the present name was given by Munsee Chief (Nannawitt). Chief Nannawitt sold lands in North Jersey, signed the Wawayanda Patent and witnessed the Cheesecock Patent.

The Erie Railroad arrived in Rockland County in 1841 along its original main line to Piermont. The New Jersey and New York Railroad, the predecessor of the Pascack Valley Line, reached Nanuet in 1869.

Geography

Nanuet is located at  (41.095296, -74.015622).
 

The topography is a result of the massive glaciation of the last ice age, and as such the soil is extremely rocky and the surface shows glacial erratic boulders. The glacial ice scraped off and carried with it rocks and minerals from as far north as Canada, depositing them in Nanuet in particular and southern New York in general. This is the hypothesized source of the manganese-rich parvo-mangano-edenite minerals, as well as the placer ore for gold panning within Nauraushaun Brook. There are fossil impressions of huge Precambrian Era jellyfish in the wooded, undeveloped regions. One prominent surface feature, a Hopewell Indian burial mound dating to 325 AD, is located near Nauraushaun Brook at the western edge of the Manhattan Woods Golf Club in West Nyack. Aerial views of this feature reveal it to have been built in the shape of a snake.

Lake Nanuet Park is a pool which is designed to look like a naturally occurring lake. The park which surrounds it offers residents a summer pool and recreational baseball/softball fields. Recent massive flooding and subsequent contamination closed the park for swimming until 2011.

Demographics

As of the census of 2000, there were 16,708 people, 5,975 households, and 4,302 families residing in the CDP. The population density was 3,080.3 per square mile (1,190.1/km2). There were 6,134 housing units at an average density of 1,130.9/sq mi (437.0/km2). The racial makeup of the CDP was 71.78% White, 13.34% African American, 0.23% Native American, 9.70% Asian, 0.08% Pacific Islander, 2.30% from other races, and 2.57% from two or more races. Hispanic or Latino of any race were 8.16% of the population.

There were 5,975 households, out of which 32.8% had children under the age of 18 living with them, 58.5% were married couples living together, 10.6% had a female householder with no husband present, and 28.0% were non-families. Of all households, 23.5% were made up of individuals, and 9.1% had someone living alone who was 65 years of age or older. The average household size was 2.71 and the average family size was 3.23.

In the CDP, the population was spread out, with 23.7% under the age of 18, 7.2% from 18 to 24, 31.1% from 25 to 44, 25.1% from 45 to 64, and 12.9% who were 65 years of age or older. The median age was 38 years. For every 100 females, there were 91.6 males. For every 100 females age 18 and over, there were 86.0 males.

The median income for a household in the CDP was $71,178, and the median income for a family was $81,205. Males had a median income of $50,713 versus $38,658 for females. The per capita income for the CDP was $30,338. About 3.6% of families and 5.2% of the population were below the poverty line, including 7.4% of those under age 18 and 4.5% of those age 65 or over.

Education

The Rockland County is home to several Blue Ribbon School of Excellence Award winners, awarded by the U.S. Department of Education. In 2016, Nanuet Senior High School was named a National Blue Ribbon winner.

 Highview Elementary School (first school in Nanuet)
 George W. Miller Elementary School.
 A. MacArthur Barr Middle School
 Nanuet Senior High School, home to the 2008-2009 girls' varsity basketball state and federation champions. The school gained national attention in 1989 when its football team claimed the New York State Division III championship. Sports Illustrated named the Nanuet team the No. 1 high school team in the state, finishing undefeated and unscored upon.
 Nanuet Union Free School District
 In 2018, ranked 89 Best School Districts in Nanuet by Niche.
 In 2018, National School Boards Association 2018 Magna Award was awarded to the Nanuet Public Schools, Nanuet, New York in recognition of the Outdoor Education Center (OEC)

Landmarks and places of interest 

 Novo-Diveevo Russian Orthodox Convent, Cemetery and adult home of the Russian Orthodox Church Outside Russia.
 The Shops at Nanuet, formerly named Nanuet Mall (which opened in 1969), is an outdoor shopping mall operated by Simon, opened in October 2013.
 Naunet Star Theatre, formerly (Naunet Theatre - Go -Round) on Rte 59 was the recording location for the Kiss album Rock and Roll Over in 1976. And has hosted many concerts throughout 1973 - 1979

In popular culture 
"Revival of Melee 5", a Super Smash Bros. Melee tournament held in Nanuet on November 17-18, 2012, has garnered controversy in the Super Smash Bros. community. In the winners' semifinals match between players Mew2King and Unknown522, an unusual rule meant that game 5 of their best-of-five series had to be replayed. This resulted in Mew2King, who won the original game 5, losing the replay.

References

External links

 Personal reminiscence page: Nanuet
 Nanuet Fire Department

Census-designated places in New York (state)
Hamlets in New York (state)
Census-designated places in Rockland County, New York
Hamlets in Rockland County, New York
Burial sites of the House of Holstein-Gottorp-Romanov